The National Speakers Association (NSA) is a US based association that supports motivational and other public speakers. It is the oldest and largest of 13 international associations comprising the Global Speakers Federation.

History 

NSA was founded in 1973 by Cavett Robert who was born 14 November 1907 in Starkville, Mississippi and died in September 1997. Even though Robert suffered from stage fright in his younger years, he joined Toastmasters International and went on to receive his first paid speech at the age of 61. Cavett's idea for NSA began with 35 attendees of the Phoenix Summer Sales Seminar in 1969. He incorporated the National Speakers Association on 12 July 1973. In July 1979,  Robert was honored with NSA's first Member of the Year Award, later renamed “The Cavett Award.” In honor of Robert's birthday, NSA celebrates the "Spirit of NSA" day every 14 November.

The association launched the Academy for Professional Speaking in January 2004 to teach those exploring a career in professional speaking. The academy consists of eLearning and the one-day Cavett Institute, named after NSA founder Cavett Robert, CSP, CPAE.

Organizational structure and operations 

NSA has its national office in Tempe, Arizona, and 34 regional chapters throughout the United States. NSA's professional competencies were adopted in June 1985 and continue to drive all facets of NSA today. These competencies are known today as the four E's: Eloquence, Expertise, Enterprise and Ethics. In January 1991, the NSA moved into the new headquarters building at 1500 South Priest Drive in Tempe, Arizona.

Membership 
National Speakers Association membership is available only to paid professional speakers and they need to provide required proofs and documents for it.

Conventions 
NSA holds an annual national convention every summer featuring successful speakers in the industry, such as Steve Forbes, Sally Hogshead, Erik Wahl, Nancy Duarte, Walter Bond, and Penn Jillette. NSA's first Convention was held 1 June 1975 with 62 attendees gathered at the Scottsdale Camelback Inn.

Labs 
NSA holds labs throughout the year featuring a deep-dive on speaking business, marketing and eloquence topics to help professional speakers grow their business and improve their speaking skills. NSA's first lab was held 30 April 1994 at the International Center for Professional Speaking.

Local and regional chapters 
The 35 individual chapters are led by an elected president and a board of directors. Chapters usually hold monthly meetings featuring a speaker and networking time. Nationally, NSA has a Chapter Leadership Council composed of past presidents who serve as resources and volunteer consultants to current chapter leaders.

CPAE Speaker Hall of Fame 

In February 1977, the Association established the Council of Peers Award for Excellence (CPAE) Speaker Hall of Fame. This lifetime award was created to honor the organization's top professional speakers for their speaking excellence and professionalism. Inductees are evaluated by their peers on the different criteria. As of 2015, 232 men and women have been inducted; there are currently 172 living members.

Certified Speaking Professional  

Conferred by the Association, the Certified Speaking Professional (CSP) designation is the speaking profession's international measure of professional platform competence. In 2015, NSA recognized 51 professional speakers, the largest class of individuals to receive the designation at the Annual NSA Convention.

Speaker Magazine 
NSA also publishes a magazine 10 times annually in print and digital formats for the marketing strategies, tips, information and innovative ideas from professional speakers. NSA's magazine was rebranded and renamed to Speaker magazine in January 2007. A year later in June 2008, Speaker magazine went digital. In 2013, NSA launched SpeakerMagazine.com and introduced a mobile application

Books 
NSA has published following books

 National Speakers Association: Celebrating 40 Years of Conventional Wisdom, describing the history of the National Speakers Association, highlighting the individuals, events, initiatives and programs involved in the association's growth and influence was published in July 2013.

Notable members 
 Les Brown
 Mark Victor Hansen
 Sally Hogshead
 Harvey Mackay
 Nido Qubein
 Laura Stack
 Zig Ziglar
 Monica Wofford
 Rich Hart

References 

Public speaking organizations
Professional associations based in the United States

Organizations established in 1973
Organizations based in Tempe, Arizona